During the 1985–86 Scottish football season, Celtic competed in the Scottish Premier Division.

Competitions

Scottish Premier Division

League table

Matches

Scottish Cup

Scottish League Cup

European Cup Winners' Cup

Glasgow Cup

Club Staff

Transfers

References

Scottish football championship-winning seasons
Celtic F.C. seasons
Celtic